Steven Bartlett may refer to:

Steven Bartlett (businessman) (born 1992), British-based businessman and entrepreneur
Steven James Bartlett  (born 1945), American philosopher and psychologist
Steve Bartlett (born 1947), American politician

See also
Stephen Bartlett Lakeman (1823–1900), adventurer and soldier